George Washington Academy (GWA), is a public charter school in St. George, Utah.  It opened in 2006 and now serves over 1000 students in grades K-7.

History
GWA was founded in 2006 with 414 enrolled students, grades K-7. In 2013 and 2021 it was named Utah Charter school of the year and in 2017 became one of eight schools in Utah to receive an official state STEM designation. As of 2019 GWA has 1010 enrolled students and is consistently named one of the top academic performing schools in the state of Utah.

Curriculum 
GWA utilizes the Core Knowledge Sequence created by E.D. Hirsch for science, social studies, health, history, geography, music, and visual arts.  The school teaches Saxon Math and utilize the Spalding Method for Language Arts and Spelling. GWA is an accredited "7 Habits" school and in an effort to develop the "whole student" utilizes a character education program as a "critical component" of the school curriculum.

Awards and recognition
 2013, Named Charter School of the Year by the Utah Association of Public Charter Schools (UAPCS)
 2016, Recognized as a top performing charter school by the National Alliance for Public Charter Schools
 2016, Awarded $10,000 from GoFundMe for winning a national fundraising competition in which the school raised $19,000 in 30 days for an outdoor facility and science lab
 2017, Granted an official STEM designation by the Utah Board of Education

References

External links
 

Charter schools in Utah
Public elementary schools in Utah
Public middle schools in Utah
Schools in Washington County, Utah
2006 establishments in Utah
Buildings and structures in St. George, Utah
Educational institutions established in 2006